Kenneth Allen Johnson (born July 13, 1963) is an American actor, producer, and model. He is known for his roles as Detective Curtis Lemansky in The Shield, Butch "Burner" Barnes in Pensacola: Wings of Gold, Detective Ham Dewey in Saving Grace, Herman Kozik in Sons of Anarchy, Matt Webb in Prime Suspect, Caleb Calhoun in Bates Motel, Dominique Luca in the CBS drama series S.W.A.T., and Tommy Welch on Chicago Fire (2014–2015).

Early life
Johnson was born in New Haven, Connecticut and was raised on a 30-acre farm in Weathersfield, Vermont. For his college education, he attended Central Connecticut State University, where he played football and basketball. 

Prior to starting his acting career, Johnson spent approximately four years modelling for agencies including Wilhelmina and Ford Models. This path led to him living for a year in Boston, Massachusetts, before finally settling in Los Angeles, California, where he eventually found acting.

Career
Johnson got his start in television commercials, including one of the first ads for LA Gear. A former champion arm wrestler, he appeared as bit characters in various television programs, such as Family Matters, Grace Under Fire, Caroline in the City, Pensacola: Wings of Gold, Sliders, 18 Wheels of Justice, Just Shoot Me!, NCIS: Los Angeles, Lie to Me, Law & Order: Special Victims Unit and The Protector.

In 1998, he appeared in the first several minutes of the first Blade, as Heatseeking Dennis, who was saved from a vampire played by Traci Lords. In October 2005, he appeared in the Smallville season 5 episode "Mortal" as metahuman Tommy Lee. He also appeared in the 2006 Hallmark Channel original film Desolation Canyon, with Stacy Keach and Patrick Duffy. Johnson then starred in the 2005 film Zzyzx, a thriller about two friends who take a detour on their way to Las Vegas.

Johnson originally auditioned for the role of ill-fated Terry Crowley in The Shield, which ultimately went to Reed Diamond. Casting directors were so impressed with his audition that they asked Johnson to come in for the role of Curtis Lemansky. He was unsure of how to go about the character, as the role was not very developed at that point. During the audition, Johnson made some choices for the character that he initially thought ruined his chances of winning the role. However, the audition turned out to be successful and he was cast. Lemansky quickly became a major player in the first season because of the chemistry Johnson shared with his castmates.

After The Shield, Johnson had recurring roles in Cold Case, first as a supposed murder victim, and later as a love interest for Lilly Rush. He was later cast in the TNT series Saving Grace, as Detective Hamilton "Ham" Dewey. Johnson also appeared during the second, third and fourth seasons of Sons of Anarchy as Sgt. At Arms and biker Herman Kozik. He also directed and starred in the short film I Heard the Mermaids Singing.

In August 2010, Johnson appeared in the Fox series Lie to Me, along with several fellow cast members from The Shield. In 2011, Johnson appeared in Lifetime's series The Protector, with fellow Sons of Anarchy co-star Ally Walker. Johnson also appeared as a regular in NBC's crime drama series Prime Suspect, playing the contractor boyfriend of the lead character, Detective Jane Timoney (Maria Bello). Also in 2011, Johnson starred as Frank Connor, a convicted drug smuggler who leaves prison after 22 years for one youthful mistake, in Few Options. In 2012, he guest starred as Tyler Gray in the sixth season of Burn Notice, and as Greg Marshall in the fourth season of The Mentalist. That following year, Johnson portrayed U.S. Marshal Max Clayton in the eighth and final season of Dexter.

Johnson appeared as Caleb Calhoun, the estranged brother of Norma Bates (Vera Farmiga), in the A&E drama-thriller series Bates Motel. He recurred in the second season, became a main cast member for the third season, and guest starred in the fourth and fifth seasons. He was then a recurring cast member in the fifth season of Covert Affairs, playing former CIA paramilitary operative James Decker. Johnson co-starred in the 2015 thriller film Solace. In August 2015, it was reported that Johnson would be part of the main cast for the second season of ABC's anthology series Secrets and Lies. 

As of autumn 2017, Johnson portrays Officer Dominique Luca in the CBS drama series S.W.A.T., based on the 2003 film of the same name, but the series also closely follows the original 1975-76 ABC series, also of the same name.

Personal life
He married his long-term girlfriend, Cathleen Oveson on December 21, 2005. They have one child, Angelica Scarlet (born 7 May 2009). Angelica is also an actress, most notably in a recurring role on S.W.A.T. as Kelly, where the character played by the elder Johnson, Dominique Luca, becomes her mentor.

On July 18, 2018, Johnson suffered unspecified injuries while filming the premiere episode of the second season. The scene involved Johnson simulating Luca hanging from the landing gear of a helicopter while the helicopter flies away. Johnson later sued the production company, Sony, over the incident. The case, as of July 2022, is still pending.

Filmography

Film

Television

References

Audio Interview (2010) with 'The Rafferty/Mills Connection' podcast
Audio Interview (2010) with 'Rex Sikes/Movie Beat' podcast
Audio Interview (2011) with 'Rex Sikes/Movie Beat Pt2' podcast

External links

 
 
 
 
 

1963 births
20th-century American male actors
21st-century American male actors
American male film actors
American male television actors
Central Connecticut State University alumni
Living people
Male actors from New Haven, Connecticut
Male actors from Vermont
Male models from Connecticut
People from Weathersfield, Vermont
Film producers from Connecticut